FIPS state codes were numeric and two-letter alphabetic codes defined in U.S. Federal Information Processing Standard Publication ("FIPS PUB") 5-2 to identify U.S. states and certain other associated areas. The standard superseded FIPS PUB 5-1 on May 28, 1987, and was superseded on September 2, 2008, by ANSI standard INCITS 38:2009.

The codes are used in Geographic Names Information System, overseen by the U.S. Board on Geographic Names. The codes were assigned by NIST and each uniquely identified a state, the District of Columbia, or an outlying area of the U.S.  These codes were used by the U.S. Census Bureau, the Department of Agriculture to form milk-processing plant numbers, some cash registers during check approval, and in the Emergency Alert System (EAS).

The FCC assigned additional numeric codes used with the EAS for territorial waters of the U.S., but these were not part of the FIPS standard.

The FIPS state alpha code for each U.S. states and the District of Columbia are identical to the postal abbreviations by the United States Postal Service. From September 3, 1987, the same was true of the alpha code for each of the outlying areas, with the exception of U.S. Minor Outlying Islands (UM) as the USPS routes mail for these islands indirectly.

Each of the various minor outlying islands that fell within alpha code UM had an individual numeric code, but no individual alpha code.

On September 2, 2008, FIPS 5-2 was one of ten standards withdrawn by NIST as a Federal Information Processing Standard.

FIPS state codes 

The following table enumerates the FIPS state alpha and numeric codes for the states, the District of Columbia, the outlying areas of the United States, the freely associated states, and trust territory, and FIPS state numeric codes for the individual minor outlying island territories.

Only actual U.S. states and the District of Columbia had FIPS state numeric codes in the range 01 through 56.

FIPS PUB 5-1 (published on June 15, 1970, and superseded by FIPS PUB 5-2 on May 28, 1987) stated that certain numeric codes "are reserved for possible future use in identifying American Samoa (03), Canal Zone (07), Guam (14), Puerto Rico (43), and Virgin Islands (52)", but these codes were omitted from FIPS PUB 5-2 without comment. These areas are marked with a *  and highlighted in red in the table below.

For states, the "Status" column in the table below includes a link to a list of the counties (boroughs and census areas in Alaska; parishes in Louisiana) for that state including the county codes as defined in FIPS PUB 6-4. The listings of counties for other areas are set out at the end of this article.

County codes

Supplemental codes for maritime areas 

The Emergency Alert System (EAS) and the weather radio service provided by NOAA use these codes to supplement FIPS PUB 5-2 to include certain maritime areas.

See also
 FIPS PUB 10-4 international region codes

References

External links
 

Geocodes
Standards of the United States